Secunder Kermani is a British journalist who is Foreign Correspondent for Channel 4 News. Kermani is a former BBC correspondent in Pakistan and Afghanistan. He was previously a reporter on the BBC's flagship current affairs programme Newsnight.

Education 
Secunder Kermani was born in London and is of Pakistani descent. Kermani attended Dulwich College and then graduated with a first class honours degree in History and Spanish from the University of Manchester, and a Masters in TV Journalism from Goldsmiths, University of London.

Career 

Kermani began reporting for the BBC's Newsnight programme in 2014. Many of his reports focused on the growth of the militant group the Islamic State in Iraq and Syria (ISIS), and Western recruits to the organisation. He secured a number of exclusive interviews with members of ISIS including British jihadist Omar Hussain, and Australian suicide bomber Jake Bilardi, as well as with relatives of other ISIS fighters.

In October 2016, it was reported that police from the Thames Valley Police Counter Terrorism department had obtained a court order allowing them to seize Kermani's laptop to view messages between him and a member of ISIS he had interviewed. The case attracted criticism from press freedom campaigners. Editor of Newsnight Ian Katz said he was "concerned that the use of the Terrorism Act to obtain communication between journalists and sources will make it very difficult for reporters to cover this issue of critical public interest."

In February 2018 Kermani was appointed the BBC's correspondent in Pakistan and Afghanistan. He has interviewed Nobel Peace Prize winner Malala Yousafzai, former Prime Minister of Pakistan Nawaz Sharif, current Pakistani Prime Minister Imran Khan, the President of Sri Lanka Maithripala Sirisena, and chief negotiator of the Afghan Taliban, Abbas Stanikzai.

Kermani has also been a reporter on an episode of the BBC's flagship documentary strand Panorama, and been a presenter on the BBC Asian Network radio station.

In 2021, Kermani was one of the main correspondents from the BBC covering the advance of the Taliban, the Fall of Kabul and the subsequent events.

In 2022, Kermani became the new Foreign Correspondent for Channel 4 News.

Awards 

2016 New York Radio Awards (Gold, Best Documentary, Gold, Best Investigative report) – "ISIS: Young, British and Radicalised” for BBC Radio 1.

2016 Association for International Broadcasting (Radio Current Affairs, Winner) – "ISIS: Young, British and Radicalised” for BBC Radio 1.

2018 Asian Media Awards – Journalist of the Year, finalist.

2018 Human Rights Press Awards (Television & Video, Winner) – BBC "Our World" documentary: “Murder on Campus” investigating the lynching of Pakistani student Mashal Khan who was accused by classmates of having committed blasphemy.

2021 nominee for a Peabody Award as a part of the writing and reporter team for the Afghanistan: Documenting A Crucial Year.

References 

Living people
Alumni of the University of Manchester
BBC newsreaders and journalists
British expatriates in Pakistan
British people of Pakistani descent
People educated at Dulwich College
Year of birth missing (living people)